Patricia Akello,  also Tricia Akello, is a Ugandan  professional model, currently signed with the Muse Model Management company in New York City. She walked the 2017 New York Fashion Week, in September, working for the Bottega Veneta brand and was featured in the cover of Women’s Wear Daily magazine.

Background and education
Akello was born in Nsambya Hospital in Uganda's capital, Kampala, in 1992. Her mother, Santa To-kema and her father Patrick To-kema, both traced their heritage to Pader District, in the Acholi sub-region of the Northern Region of Uganda. She attended ABC Nursery School, then ABC Primary School for her early education. She then transferred to Comprehensive College Kitetika, in Wakiso District, for both O-Level and A-Level schooling, graduating in 2010.

Career
In 2011, right out of high school, she began looking for a modelling agency to sign her up, without finding any takers. In 2014 Akello met Aamito Stacie Lagum, another Ugandan model, who had just returned from an engagement outside the country. Aamito invited Akello to the upcoming welcome party. Aamito connected Akello with Joram Job Muzira, Aamito’s then manager, who signed her up under the Joram Model Management Agency. Akello began work and modeled during the 2014 Kampala Fashion Week. During that week she modeled outfits by fashion designers Gloria Wavamunno and Sylvia Owori.

After the event in Kampala, her agent informed her of a modelling scout who wanted to sign her up with a modelling agency in South Africa. After giving her consent, Akello was flown to South Africa and signed with Fusion Models Agency, in Cape Town, on a three-year contract. Under that contract, she walked in Mercedes-Benz Fashion Week, in Berlin, both in 2015 and 2016.

Career in New York City
In August 2016, Akello relocated from Cape Town to New York City and was signed by the  Muse Model Management Agency, in New York. She is also concurrently signed up with MP Management, in Paris and with M4 Models Management, in Germany. In an interview with the Daily Monitor newspaper, Akello is upbeat about her prospects and the opportunities available to her in the industry. She globe-trots between assignments in at least seven cities on three continents (Africa, Europe and North America), squeezing in a visit to her native Uganda every Christmas.

See also
 Pader, Uganda

References

External links
Photos: Ugandan model Patricia Akello killing it on the runway at Mercedes Benz Fashion Week in South Africa As of 6 March 2015.

Living people
1993 births
Acholi people
Ugandan female models
21st-century Ugandan businesswomen
21st-century Ugandan businesspeople
People from Pader District
People from Northern Region, Uganda